The Mystery of Yellow Aster Mine is a 1913 American short drama silent black and white film directed by Frank Borzage and starring Wallace Reid, Pauline Bush and Arthur Rosson. It was made in June and released on August 26.

Cast
 Wallace Reid as Reid - Rosson's Brother
 Pauline Bush as Pauline
 Arthur Rosson as Rosson - Reid's Brother
 Frank Borzage

See also
Wallace Reid filmography

References

External links
 
 

Films directed by Frank Borzage
Films with screenplays by Bess Meredyth
American silent short films
1913 short films
Silent American drama films
1913 drama films
1913 films
American black-and-white films
Universal Pictures short films
1913 directorial debut films
1910s American films